The Parc Arboretum de Saint-Setiers is a private park and arboretum located in Saint-Setiers, Corrèze, Limousin, France. It is open daily in the warmer months; an admission fee is charged.

The park and its arboretum were established in the 19th century, and now contain about 115 species of trees and shrubs including a Thujopsis specimen dating from 1802 and a large Douglas fir from 1895, as well as a 5 kilometer forest trail, a river island covered with rhododendrons, and a monumental earthen sculpture (La Grande Nageuse) by Gerhard Lentink.
It is also possible to see the sculpture of  Marc Duquesnoy realized in 2008, in the stock of a tree : the wood combined with the porcelain.

See also 
 List of botanical gardens in France
 Marc Duquesnoy

References 
 Jardins du Massif Central description (French)
 Carnet de Jardins en Limousin, page 8 (French)
 Tourismorama description (French)
 Jardinez description (French)

Saint-Setiers, Parc Arboretum de
Saint-Setiers, Parc Arboretum de